Viliame Bale Liga (11 June 1932 – 1992) was a Fijian Olympic javelin thrower. He represented his country in the men's javelin throw at the 1968 Summer Olympics. His distance was a 62.32 in the qualifiers.

References

External links

Fijian javelin throwers
Olympic athletes of Fiji
Athletes (track and field) at the 1954 British Empire and Commonwealth Games
Athletes (track and field) at the 1958 British Empire and Commonwealth Games
Athletes (track and field) at the 1962 British Empire and Commonwealth Games
Athletes (track and field) at the 1968 Summer Olympics
1932 births
1992 deaths
Commonwealth Games competitors for Fiji
20th-century Fijian people